Niphona yanoi is a species of beetle in the family Cerambycidae. It was described by Masaki Matsushita in 1934. It is known from Taiwan and Japan.

References

yanoi
Beetles described in 1934